The 2021 season is Balestier Khalsa's 26th consecutive season in the top flight of Singapore football and in the Singapore Premier League and the Singapore Cup.

Squad

Singapore Premier League

U21

Project Vaults Oxley SC
(Deputy Chairman, Darwin Jalil is the President for the club)

Coaching staff

Transfer

In 

Pre-Season

Mid-Season

Out 
Pre-Season

Mid-Season

Loan In 
Pre-Season

Mid-Season

Loan Return 
Mid-Season

Loan Out 
Pre-Season

Mid-Season

Extension / Retained

Friendly

Pre-Season Friendly

In-season friendlies

Team statistics

Appearances and goals

Numbers in parentheses denote appearances as substitute.

Competitions

Overview

Singapore Premier League

Singapore Cup

See also 
 2016 Balestier Khalsa FC season
 2017 Balestier Khalsa FC season
 2018 Balestier Khalsa FC season
 2019 Balestier Khalsa FC season
 2020 Balestier Khalsa FC season

Notes

References 

Balestier Khalsa FC
Balestier Khalsa FC seasons
1